Anaocha is a Local Government Area in Anambra State, south-eastern Nigeria. Towns that make up the local government are Aguluzigbo, Agulu, Neni, Ichida, Adazi-Ani, Adazi-Enu, Adazi-Nnukwu, Akwaeze, Nri, Obeledu.

Schools
Here is the list of secondary schools in Anaocha Local Government Area:
 Girls High School, Agulu
 Flora A.M.C.S.S. Neni
 Loretto Secondary School, Adazi
 Community Secondary School, Obeledu
 Community Secondary School, Ichida
 Community High School, Aguluzigbo
 Bubendorff Memorial Grammar School, Adazi Nnukwu
 Community Secondary School, Agulu
 Ojiako Memorial Grammar School, Adazi Ani
 Union Secondary School, Agulu
 Community Secondary School, Adazi
 Community High School, Akwaeze
 Grammar School, Agulu
 Lake City Secondary School, Nri
 Girls Secondary School, Adazi-Nnukwu
 Regal Secondary School, Nri

Notable people
Emeka Nwokedi – conductor and music director

References
LOCAL GOVERNMENT AREAS IN ANAMBRA STATE dated July 21, 2007; accessed October 4, 2007

Local Government Areas in Anambra State
Local Government Areas in Igboland